Cdc42 effector protein 2 is a protein that in humans is encoded by the CDC42EP2 gene.

Function 

CDC42, a small Rho GTPase, regulates the formation of F-actin-containing structures through its interaction with the downstream effector proteins. The protein encoded by this gene is a member of the Borg family of CDC42 effector proteins. Borg family proteins contain a CRIB (Cdc42/Rac interactive-binding) domain. They bind to, and negatively regulate the function of, CDC42. Coexpression of this protein with dominant negative mutant CDC42 protein in fibroblast was found to induce pseudopodia formation, which suggested a role of this protein in actin filament assembly and cell shape control.

Interactions 

CDC42EP2 has been shown to interact with CDC42 and RHOQ.

References

External links

Further reading